Glenea basalis is a species of beetle in the family Cerambycidae. It was described by James Thomson in 1865.

Subspecies
 Glenea basalis basalis Thomson, 1865
 Glenea basalis diversa Thomson, 1865

References

basalis
Beetles described in 1865